The 2013 OEC Kaohsiung was a professional tennis tournament played on hard courts. It was the second edition of the tournament which was part of the 2013 ATP Challenger Tour. It took place in Kaohsiung, Taiwan between 16 and 22 September 2013.

Singles main-draw entrants

Seeds

 1 Rankings are as of September 9, 2013.

Other entrants
The following players received wildcards into the singles main draw:
  Lee Hsin-han
  Peng Hsien-yin
  Wang Chieh-fu
  Yang Tsung-hua

The following players received entry from the qualifying draw:
  Toshihide Matsui
  Yasutaka Uchiyama
  Yuki Bhambri
  Chung Hyeon

Champions

Singles

 Lu Yen-hsun def.  Yuki Bhambri, 6–4, 6–3

Doubles

 Juan Sebastián Cabal /  Robert Farah def.  Yuki Bhambri /  Wang Chieh-fu, 6–4, 6–2

References

External links
Official Website

OEC Kaohsiung
OEC Kaohsiung
2013 in Taiwanese tennis